Glenwood Inn may refer to

 The Glenwood Inn (Hornellsville, New York)
 The Mission Inn Hotel & Spa in Riverside, California, which was originally named the Glenwood Inn